Koral may refer to:

 Koral, Punjab, a village and Union Council in Islamabad Capital Territory, Pakistan
 Zastava Koral or Yugo, a Yugoslav/Serbian car produced from 1980 to 2008
 KORAL Electronic Warfare System

People
 Alexander Koral (fl. 1939–1948), American Soviet spy
 Helen Koral (fl. 1939–1948), American Soviet spy, wife of Alexander Koral
 Füreya Koral (1910–1997), Turkish ceramic artist
 Mehmet Emin Koral (1881–1959), Turkish general

See also
 Coral (disambiguation)
 Korall, a Russian cheese